Apapa is a Local Government Area in Lagos, located to the west of Lagos Island. Apapa contains a number of ports and terminals operated by the Nigerian Ports Authority (NPA), including the major port of Lagos State and Lagos Port Complex (LPC).

In its legislation, the NPA itself does not refer to any port called "Port of Apapa", rather it refers to the "Port of Lagos", "Port of Port Harcourt" and "Port of Calabar".

Overview 

The region of Apapa lies near the mouth of Lagos lagoon, and contains  ports and terminals for various commodities such as containers and bulk cargo, houses, offices and a small old disused railway station (Apapa North). It is the site of a major container terminal which was owned and operated by the Federal Government of Nigeria until March 2005, and now is operated by the Danish firm A. P. Moller-Maersk Group. Adjacent to the container port is the Tin Can Island Port, which has ro-ro facilities.

It also houses some refineries like the Bua Group. It also has commercial offices of many shipping, clearing and transportation companies. Other notable buildings include the Folawiyo Towers. Apapa houses the headquarters of the Nigerian newspaper Thisday.

History
An important bronze hoard of jewellery dating from the 16th Century was found in Apapa in 1907 and is now kept at the British Museum.

In 1950, the development of an industrial and housing estate covering 1000 acres began. The estate was completed in 1957/1958 and it flourished along with the expansion of the Apapa Wharf. The estate once accounted for a large number of industrial and construction workers in Lagos.

Government and infrastructure

Prisons of the Nigerian Prisons Service include:
Kirikiri Maximum Security Prison

Housing, education and social facilities

The district provides housing for various levels of housing needs from executive requirements to average families including single occupation and multiple storied accommodation. There are several schools. The German School Lagos was formerly located in Apapa.

Social and recreational facilities are provided by private and public organizations including a boat club located on Apapa Creek.

See also 

 Railway stations in Nigeria
 Apapa Amusement Park

References

External links

 Apapa Local Government

Local Government Areas in Yorubaland
Local Government Areas in Lagos State
Populated coastal places in Lagos State
Port cities and towns in Nigeria
Ports and harbours of Lagos
Neighborhoods of Lagos